Walter Stanley Barrett (January 9, 1885 – June 11, 1931) was a college football player.

Sewanee
Barrett was a prominent running back for the Sewanee Tigers football team of Sewanee:The University of the South.

He was captain and quarterback in 1907, for one of Sewanee's greatest teams. Barrett was selected All-Southern.

References

American football quarterbacks
American football running backs
Sewanee Tigers football players
Players of American football from Tennessee
People from Covington, Tennessee
All-Southern college football players
1885 births
1931 deaths